Ribble Valley Borough Council elections are held every four years. Ribble Valley Borough Council is the local authority for the non-metropolitan district of Ribble Valley in Lancashire, England. Since the last boundary changes in 2019, 39 councillors have been elected from 26 wards.

Political control

The first election to the council was held in 1973, initially operating as a shadow authority before coming into its powers on 1 April 1974. Since 1973 political control of the council has been held by the following parties:

Leadership
The leaders of the council since 1999 have been:

Council elections
1973 Ribble Valley Borough Council election
1976 Ribble Valley Borough Council election (New ward boundaries)
1979 Ribble Valley Borough Council election
1983 Ribble Valley Borough Council election
1987 Ribble Valley Borough Council election (Borough boundary changes took place but the number of seats remained the same)
1991 Ribble Valley Borough Council election
1995 Ribble Valley Borough Council election
1999 Ribble Valley Borough Council election
2003 Ribble Valley Borough Council election (New ward boundaries increased the number of seats by 1)
2007 Ribble Valley Borough Council election
2011 Ribble Valley Borough Council election
2015 Ribble Valley Borough Council election
2019 Ribble Valley Borough Council election (new ward boundaries)

Election results

By-election results

1995-1999

1999-2003

2007-2011

2011-2015

2019-2023

References

By-election results

External links
Ribble Valley Borough Council

Politics of Ribble Valley
Ribble Valley District Council elections
Council elections in Lancashire
District council elections in England